Arvid Hoflund (12 June 1883 – 15 September 1952) was a Swedish sports shooter. He competed in the 300m military rifle event at the 1912 Summer Olympics.

References

External links
 

1883 births
1952 deaths
Swedish male sport shooters
Olympic shooters of Sweden
Shooters at the 1912 Summer Olympics
People from Eskilstuna
Sportspeople from Södermanland County